Drag Den is a Philippine drag pageantry reality competition television series hosted by Manila Luzon. It premiered on 8 December 2022 on Amazon Prime Video. The series is produced by Cornerstone Studios and Project 8 Projects. Rod Singh created and directed the series, and Singh and Antoinette Jadaone produced it.

In the series, eight drag queens compete to be titled the "First Filipino Drag Supreme". NAIA won the first season of Drag Den.

Production 

In July 2021, RuPaul's Drag Race alumna Manila Luzon told Entertainment Weekly about an upcoming project she was going to host and judge. Luzon said, "I'm excited that we're going to create an opportunity similar to [what] RuPaul and World of Wonder have given to me." In a December 2021 interview, Luzon said, "Drag is still kind of underground here, so I'm excited to bring the Filipino audience and let them see underground". 

The show was originally announced to be hosted on WeTV, but it ultimately premiered on Amazon Prime Video. It is produced by Cornerstone Studios and Project 8 Projects. Rod Singh created, directed, and produced the series. 

On 16 August 2021, Luzon announced a casting call for TikTok submissions, with a deadline of 31 August 2021. After the casting call announcement for Drag Den, RuPaul announced a casting call for Drag Race Philippines. RuPaul was criticized by some fans for announcing a competing show, but Luzon publicly shared her support of Drag Race Philippines. In 2022, Drag Race Philippines judge Jiggly Caliente said, "There is definitely no rivalry because Manila [Luzon] knew about me doing Drag Race, and I knew about her doing Drag Den."

Luzon is signed to Warner Music Philippines, and announced the theme song for the series would release on 2 December 2022.

Release and promotion 
Though the series was announced in July 2021, its social media accounts stopped posting from May 2022 to September 2022. On 13 September 2022, the show's Twitter account posted an update with the caption "#justwokeup". On 16 November 2022, an official teaser video was revealed. The video announced that the show would premiere in December 2022.

On 17 November, the preview trailer revealed the eight contestants. Sassa Gurl, Nicole Cordoves, and Manila Luzon appeared in the same trailer as the main judges of the show. The trailer also revealed the official premiere date, 8 December 2022, and distribution through Amazon Prime Video. Also on 17 November, the show presented a campaign titled "Manila by Night" in reference to the controversial 1980 Philippine film of the same name. 

On 30 November 2022, an official trailer for the series premiered; it confirmed that Catriona Gray would appear as a guest judge, known as the "Drag Enforcer", in the first episode.

Contestants 

Notes:

Contestant progress 
Legend:

Contestant rankings

Guest judges 
Guest judges are known as the "Drag Enforcer" in the series. Guest judges are listed in chronological order.

 Catriona Gray, model and winner of Miss Universe 2018.
 K Brosas, actress and comedian.
 Eula Valdez, actress.
 KZ Tandingan, singer and rapper.
 Francis Libiran, architect and fashion designer.
 Antoinette Jadaone, filmmaker and podcaster.
 Mela Habijan, model and winner of Miss Trans Global 2020.
Drag queens Mama Pie, Mama Let-Let, and Mama Bobby guested on episode 8, but did not judge on the main stage.

Episodes

References

External links 
 

 
2020s LGBT-related reality television series
2020s Philippine television series
2022 in LGBT history
2022 Philippine television series debuts
Amazon Prime Video original programming
English-language television shows
Filipino-language television shows
Philippine LGBT-related television shows
Philippine reality television series
Television shows filmed in the Philippines
Television shows set in the Philippines